Mustafa Kemal station, known as Soğuksu station until 2013, is a railway station on the Marmaray commuter rail line, in İstanbul, Turkey. It is located in Cumhuriyet neighborhood of Küçükçekmece district. The station is situated on İstasyon Street, east of Lake Küçükçekmece.

The station was opened on 4 December 1955 for the start of commuter service between Sirkeci and Halkalı. In 2013, the station was closed down when commuter service was temporarily suspended for the rehabilitation of the railway and its stations. It was demolished and rebuilt with an expected opening date of 2015. However, due to numerous delays, the station did not reopen until 12 March 2019. Soğuksu was closed in 2013 due to the rehabilitation and construction of the new Marmaray line.

References

Railway stations in Istanbul Province
Railway stations closed in 2013
Küçükçekmece
2013 disestablishments in Turkey
Things named after Mustafa Kemal Atatürk